Günther Vanaudenaerde (born 23 January 1984) is a Belgian former professional footballer who played as a right back.

Football career
After playing youth football for FC Lissewege, KSC Blankenberge and Cercle Brugge, Vanaudenaerde made his debut in professional football as part of the Club Brugge squad in the 2005–06 season. Under manager Jan Ceulemans, he was given the opportunity to play several times, often due to injuries to regular right back Olivier De Cock. Emilio Ferrera, who replaced Ceulemans as head coach in April 2006, found Vanaudenaerde wanting and indicated at the beginning of the 2006–07 season that he was allowed to leave the club.

Vanaudenaerde then moved to NEC for a reported fee of €150,000 in July 2006. He received little playing time, and he returned to Belgium after only one season, where he signed a contract with Westerlo. After the club suffered relegation to the Belgian Second Division in 2012, Vanaudenaerde signed a two-year contract with OH Leuven. In the 2014–15 season, he played for Royal Antwerp, and since the summer of 2015 for Sint-Eloois-Winkel Sport, where he played until January 2019. After this, Vanaudenaerde left for Torhout, where he continued to play until January 2020, after which he ended he announced his retirement from football.

Honours
Club Brugge
Belgian Super Cup: 2005

References

External links
Stats from Guardian Football

1984 births
Living people
Belgian footballers
Cercle Brugge K.S.V. players
Club Brugge KV players
NEC Nijmegen players
K.V.C. Westerlo players
Oud-Heverlee Leuven players
Royal Antwerp F.C. players
Belgian Pro League players
Challenger Pro League players
Eredivisie players
Belgian expatriate footballers
Expatriate footballers in the Netherlands
People from Knokke-Heist
Association football defenders
Sint-Eloois-Winkel Sport players
Footballers from West Flanders